The 2010–11 OFC Champions League, also known as the 2011 O-League for short, was the 10th edition of the Oceanian Club Championship, Oceania's premier club football tournament organized by the Oceania Football Confederation (OFC), and the 5th season under the current OFC Champions League name. It was contested by eight teams from seven countries. The teams were split into two four-team pools, the winner of each pool contesting the title of O-League Champion and the right to represent the OFC at the 2011 FIFA Club World Cup.

The tournament was won by Auckland City of New Zealand.

Participants

Schedule

The match schedule is as follows.

Group stage
The official draw was conducted at the OFC Executive Committee meeting in Johannesburg, South Africa in June 2010, and announced by the OFC on 11 June 2010.

In each group, the teams played each other home-and-away in a round-robin format, with the group winner advancing to the final. If two or more teams are tied on points, the tiebreakers are as follow:
Goal difference
Goals scored
Head-to-head record among teams concerned (points; goal difference; goals scored)
Fair play record
Drawing of lots

Group A

Notes
 Note 1: Postponed from 4 December 2010 due to Hekari United's involvement in the 2010 FIFA Club World Cup.

Group B

Notes
 Note 2: Postponed from 5 February 2011 due to unsuitability of the Stade Numa Daly.

Final

The winners of groups A and B played in the final over two legs. The hosts of each leg was decided by draw, and announced by the OFC on 22 March 2011. The away goals rule would be applied, and extra time and penalty shootout would be used to decide the winner if necessary.

Auckland City won 6–1 on aggregate. As OFC Champions League winners they qualify for the qualifying round of the 2011 FIFA Club World Cup.

Goalscorers
 Goalscorer statistics correct as of 17 April 2011.

References

External links
OFC Champions League

OFC Champions League seasons
1